Oleg Anatolyevich Kamshilov (born 1 January 1969) is a Russian statesman and lawyer. He was appointed Prosecutor of the Republic of Crimea on 2 February 2017. State Counselor of Justice 2nd Class (2018).

First Deputy Prosecutor of the city of Moscow (from 24 November 2015 to 28 December 2016).

Biography 

Born in 1969 in the village of Piketnoye, in Omsk Oblast.

1988-1989 —  served in the Soviet Army.

1992  —  Graduated from Omsk state University and began his career in the Prosecutor's office as an assistant Prosecutor, Marianovsky district of Omsk region.

1996-2000 — Prosecutor of the Cherlak district of Omsk region.

2000-2003 — Chief of Department on supervision of execution of laws by bodies of GNS, Federal Tax Police Service of the Russian Federation and FSB of the Prosecutor's office of Omsk region.

2003-2006 — First Deputy of City of Omsk Prosecutor.

2006-2015 — First Deputy Prosecutor of the Krasnoyarsk territory.

24 November 2015 – 28 December 2016 — First Deputy Prosecutor of Moscow.

From 2 February 2017 — Prosecutor Republic of Crimea.

The Prosecutor of Crimea 
On December 27, 2016 it became known that the Prosecutor General Yuri Chaika nominated the first Deputy Prosecutor of Moscow, Oleg Kamshilov, for the post of Prosecutor of the Republic Crimea. His candidacy for the meeting was approved by the deputies of the Crimean Parliament, according to the website of the State Council of the Republic of Crimea.

In turn, Oleg Kamshilov outlined the priorities of his work: in the first place he put the protection of social rights of the inhabitants of the Crimea and in the second, the legality of the use of budgetary funds, as well as the maintenance of law and order.

On February 2, 2017 by presidential decree, he was appointed Prosecutor of the Republic of Crimea.

On June 11, 2018 Oleg Kamshilov was awarded the rank of state Councilor of Justice, 2nd class.

Check related to the movie Matilda 

In 2017, the Prosecutor of the Republic of Crimea Oleg Kamshilov punished his subordinates from Prosecutor's Office of Simferopol who banned cinemas Simferopol from showing trailer of the film Matilda. However, the ban has caused mixed reaction from the new Prosecutor of the Crimea Oleg Kamshilov, in this regard, the Prosecutor's office of the Republic of Crimea began the official investigation.

As it became known that during preparation of the act of reaction they roughly violated the order of consideration of addresses and adoption of the relevant decisions. a decision has been made, that the appeal deputy state Duma Natalia Poklonskaya will be considered by the Prosecutor's office of Crimea. Soon the warning was declared invalid and cancelled.

A dismissed employee of the Prosecutor's office of Simferopol Alexander Kitova, which banned the cinemas Simferopol to show the trailer for scandalous film Matilda.

Sanctions 
On June 20, 2017, Prosecutor Republic of Crimea Oleg Kamshilov was added to the new US sanctions list. United States extended the sanction against the Russian Federation. In particular, 38 individuals and organizations were added to the sanctions list.

On 1 September the Australian Government imposed sanctions on Oleg Kamshilov.

References 

Russian prosecutors
Russian lawyers
1969 births
Living people
Russian individuals subject to the U.S. Department of the Treasury sanctions